SK Gaming  is a professional esports organization based in Germany that has teams across the world competing in different titles. SK is particularly known for their success in Counter-Strike (CS) tournaments. SK's Brazilian CS team won the ESL One Cologne 2016 Major. SK currently has players and teams competing in  League of Legends and Hearthstone. SK Gaming was founded in 1997 by a small group of Quake players in Oberhausen.

History

Beginnings 
Schroet Kommando was founded in 1997 as a German Quake clan by four brothers and three accomplices in Oberhausen. The original line-up of Schroet Kommando consisted of Ralf "Griff" Reichert, Daniel "Godlike" Beames, Tim "Burke" Reichert, Benjamin "Kane" Reichert, Kristof "Speed" Salwiczek, Carsten "Storch" Kramer and Sven "Ramses" Tümmers.  According to Ralf Reichert, the original naming of the organization originated from one of the members repeatedly shouting "Schröt!" This was a common occurrence from whenever a double-barreled shotgun would be handled, due to the translation meaning "shrapnel". Eventually, the team adopted this into their name, thus becoming "Schroet Kommando". Since then, the organization began using their abbreviation more often, until it eventually became SK Gaming.

Initially, the Beames family home operated as the Schroet Kommando headquarters, concentrating primarily upon the Quake series. Early on, Schroet Kommando became one of the first clans to feature an all-female team; the most notable of which was Annemarie "XS" Warnkross, who later became a well-known host on German television. The organization expanded into Counter-Strike, where it became known as one of the most-successful squads in all of Germany. In September 2001, Andreas "bds" Thorstensson merged his Geekboys team and news syndicate with that of SK Gaming, with a long-term prospect of emphasizing the success of his own organization. Thorstensson revolutionized electronic sports by having SK act as the first organization to have payable premium services ("SK Insider", a virtual marketplace in which subscribers could download demos (replays), mods and add-ons better and earlier than others, talk directly to SK gamers etc.). The organization's international Counter-Strike success came when they signed on the players of the successful Swedish Counter-Strike clan Ninjas in Pyjamas. In 2003, SK Gaming became the first electronic sports organization to contract players, beginning with the SK Sweden Counter-Strike squad.

Later years 
The 2006 season brought no successes to the Counter-Strike team, the most notable of which, the team failed to qualify for the Electronic Sports World Cup, in which Sweden was represented by rivals Ninjas in Pyjamas and the developing Fnatic team. Thereafter, the team managed to qualify for the KODE5 finals, where they won two matches and lost to the Brazilians from Made in Brazil during the group stages. They then lost to Wisdom Nerve Victory in the single elimination round, placing fifth to eighth overall. Success did come for the Quake 4 squad however, as the Swedish star player Johan "Toxic" Quick managed to win eight out of the ten major tournaments during that year, including four out of five World Championships. Meanwhile, the FIFA 06 squad had a successful year, as the team managed to win the prestigious Electronic Sports League Pro Series twice, and the German player Daniel "hero" Schellhase won the World Cyber Games championship.

In 2008, SK Gaming began to invest in World of Warcraft and shortly before the release of the Sunwell Plateau, the final and most challenging raid encounter of World of Warcraft: The Burning Crusade, the organization sponsored Curse, one of the highest-ranked guilds at the time. SK Gaming's German competitor, Mousesports, had significantly commanded the recognition with maintaining Nihilum, the most-successful guild in the world, achieving a strong majority of world first raid kills. The newly recruited SK.PvE squad, however, had a strong winning streak during the Sunwell Plateau and completed most of the instance's boss kills first. Due to differences in interests, the PvE team was dismissed, with a stronger emphasis upon the PvP aspect. Near the end of 2008, SK Gaming entered the competitive console scene, with acquisition of a German Xbox team.

Stability issues and reorganization 
Beginning in the fall of 2009, the Counter-Strike squad would encounter long-term stability issues, as long-time member  Kristoffer "Tentpole" Nordlund and Marcus "zet" Sundström were removed from the roster for disagreements and misrepresentation issues. The roster began refocusing with the acquisition of H2k Gaming players Johan "face" Klasson and Frej "kHRYSTAL" Sjöström, which gained its best respective victory two weeks after the change with a gold medal victory against Fnatic. 2009 marked the conclusion of managing director and partial owner Andreas Thorstensson's tenure, as he stepped down from SK Gaming to further pursue his web development career, giving full executive authority to Alexander T. Müller-Rodic, thereby making SK Gaming a singular German organization. Alongside Thorstensson's departure, the highly successful Warcraft III departed, as well, in order to make way for SK Gaming to operate as a more conservative business. To accommodate for the Counter-Strike stability issues, SK Gaming announced the replacement of Frej "kHRYSTAL" Sjöström with the former Fnatic player Rasmus "GuX" Ståhl. In one of the greatest controversies in electronic sports history, the organization Fnatic arranged for Rasmus "GuX" Ståhl to rejoin their Counter-Strike team, after a series of failed performances. Ståhl did not technically sign his contract with SK after five months, while still receiving months of payment and was intended to attend Arbalet Dallas with his team, after his plane ticket was purchased. However, it was revealed through Ståhl's message logs that Fnatic had paid him not to use SK's ticket to Dallas Despite the closure of SK's investment into the Action RTS scene with the departure of its Defense of the Ancients team in 2009, SK Gaming took in a squad for the relatively unknown title Avalon Heroes in 2010, as well as an American Heroes of Newerth squad and a European League of Legends squad. In August 2010, welcomed back Warcraft III veteran Fredrik "MaDFroG" Johansson, with the creation of the organization's StarCraft II division. 2010 marked the final year in which SK Gaming would support World of Warcraft, with the removal of its European, American and Asian squads, as well as the unannounced closure of its Sansibar squad. On 3 December, it was announced that the German FIFA duo of Daniel "hero" Schellhase and Dennis "styla" Schellhase would be retiring from eSports, following a joint brotherly career as the most-successful virtual sports players of all time. In a massive Counter-Strike roster overhaul on 7 December, SK Gaming signed on the departing Fnatic players Patrik "f0rest" Lindberg and Christopher "GeT_RiGhT" Alesund, (the latter of whom played for the organization previously), while also seeing the departure of Dennis "walle" Wallenberg. On 21 December, it was announced that SK Gaming would be closing its Counter-Strike female team, as well as its short-lived Counter-Strike: Source team, in order to retain a more conservative roster for 2011.

The first development of 2011 constituted the trimming of the Xbox 360 sports roster and the addition of a competitive Call of Duty: Black Ops team, as well as the addition of newcomers Hun "inuh" Park and Jimmy "jimpo" Wölfinger to the StarCraft II team. These new StarCraft II players would, however, become the entirety of the division, as it was soon announced afterwards that Fredrik "MaDFroG" Johansson would not be given a contract for 2011. On 16 January, it was announced that SK Gaming would be adding another United States Counter-Strike division, which would include former SK Gaming female member Alice "ali" Lew. On 28 February, SK Gaming announced that Toshiba would be taking the reins of main sponsor from Acer Inc., which had served as the primary sponsor since 2009. On 12 March, SK Gaming announced the additions of the up and rising StarCraft II Dane Johannes Sabroe "Joe" Witt, as well as a Bloodline Champions squad. On 4 April, five-year Counter-Strike player, Jimmy "allen" Allén, announced his inactivity, due to considerable health ailments, setting the stage for the trial replacement, Dennis "dennis" Edman. However, on 23 May, SK Gaming declared that Edman would no longer be playing for the organization and that Allén would participate in the WCG Swedish Qualifier the following weekend. On 29 May, however, a permanent replacement was made with the still-contracted Fnatic player and former SK stand-in, Marcus "Delpan" Larsson. On 23 June, following a disappointing Dreamhack appearance, SK Gaming's League of Legends team underwent a massive overhaul, removing the vast majority of the squad, but bringing in recently dismissed players from other professional organizations. On 1 July, it was announced that the SK Gaming's Heroes of Newerth team would be replaced by the former squad of Evil Geniuses. On Independence Day of 2011, SK Gaming released its European StarCraft II roster consisting of Hun "inuh" Park, Jimmy "jimpo" Wölfinger and Johannes Sabroe "Joe" Witt, citing unsatisfactory performances. The squad was remade, however, on 15 July, with the partnership with the South Korean pro-gamer house Old Generations, for SK Gaming to sponsor Min Chul "MC" Jang and Yoon-Yeol "NaDa" Lee for international events. Due to long-term prospective differences, the Heroes of Newerth once again parted ways with the organization, during SK's attendance at Gamescom. SK Gaming would invest in a different sector of the action RTS scene, however, with the acquisition of an all-Danish Dota 2 squad previously known as Next Evolution ESC, in November 2011, but dismissed the team for the unpredictability of the relatively young scene for the game.

In early 2012, the partnership between SK Gaming and Old Generations ended, with Min Chul "MC" Jang joining the organization, while Yoon-Yeol "NaDa" Lee remained with oGs. In a surprising move, SK Gaming announced that the Counter-Strike team would be removing the player with the shortest tenure, Marcus "Delpan" Larsson, in favor of their first permanent Danish member and former mTw ace, Martin Alexander "trace" Bang Heldt at the end of January. On 13 April, however, Larsson once more returned to the team, replacing Heldt. On 27 July 2012, it was announced that SK Gaming's Counter-Strike division would lose Robert "RobbaN" Dahlström, Patrik "f0rest" Lindberg and Christopher "GeT_RiGhT" Alesund, as well as team captain Anton Budak, due to SK's decision to not send the team to GameGune 2012. On 30 July, SK Gaming announced the final closing of the Counter-Strike division.

On 15 January 2013, it was determined that SteelSeries has ended their ten-year sponsorship of SK Gaming, in addition to Evil Geniuses. In an annual wrap-up, SK's CEO Alexander T. Müller-Rodic announced the departures of League of Legends players Carlos "ocelote" Rodríguez Santiago, Patrick "Nyph" Funke, as well as the sole StarCraft II player Min Chul "MC" Jang and sports player Bruce "Spank" Grannec.

In January 2017 it was announced that Visa would be a sponsor of SK Gaming.

Business model 

SK Gaming is incorporated as a German limited liability company (GmbH). Its owners are Alexander Müller-Rodic, Andreas Thorstensson and Ralf Reichert. SK Gaming operates largely due to its sponsorships, most-notably by Toshiba, Kingston Technology and Bigben. The company also finances itself by the "SK Insider" subscription service. However, according to Rodic, the vast majority of the company's funds originates from sponsorships.

League of Legends 
Riot Games announced on 20 November 2018 that SK Gaming would be one of ten franchise partners participating in the newly rebranded League of Legends European Championship (LEC). On 20 December 2018, the organisation announced it had signed top laner Jorge "Werlyb" Casanovas Moreno-Torres, jungler Oskar "Selfmade" Boderek, mid laner Choi "Pirean" Jun-sik, bot laner Jus "Crownshot" Marusic and support Han "Dreams" Min-kook for their starting roster in the 2019 LEC Spring Split.

Active rosters

FIFA

Hearthstone

League of Legends

Notable alumni 
 Tim "Burke" Reichert (Quake)
 Benjamin "Kane" Reichert (Quake)
 Musa "kila" Celik (Quake)
 Emil "HeatoN" Christensen (Counter-Strike)
 Andreas "bds" Thorstensson (Counter-Strike)
 Fredrik "MaDFroG" Johansson (Warcraft III, StarCraft II)
 Lee "NaDa" Yoon-yeol (StarCraft II)
 Patrik "f0rest" Lindberg (Counter-Strike)
 Christopher "GeT_RiGhT" Alesund (Counter-Strike)
 Jang "MC" Min-chul (StarCraft II)
 Dennis "Svenskeren" Johnsen (League of Legends)
 Mikail "Maikelele" Bill (Counter-Strike: Global Offensive)
 Shane "rapha" Hendrixson (Quake)
 Gabriel "FalleN" Toledo de Alcântara Sguario (Counter-Strike: Global Offensive)

Selected achievements

Counter-Strike: Global Offensive 
Bold denotes a CS:GO Major

2016 
 1st ESL One Cologne 2016 
 3rd-4th ESL One New York 2016
 2nd ESL Pro League Season 4, 2016 
 2nd Intel Extreme Masters Season XI Oakland
 3rd-4th ELEAGUE Season 2
 3rd-4th Esports Championship Series Season 2

2017 
 3rd-4th ELEAGUE Major 2017 
 2nd DreamHack Masters Las Vegas 2017 
 1st cs_summit 
 1st Intel Extreme Masters Season XII - Sydney
 1st DreamHack Open Summer 2017 
 1st Esports Championship Series Season 3 
 5th-8th PGL Major Kraków 2017 
 3rd-4th ESL One New York 2017 
 1st EPICENTER 2017 
 3rd-4th Intel Extreme Masters Season XII – Oakland
 1st BLAST Pro Series: Copenhagen 2017 
 1st ESL Pro League Season 6

2018 
 3rd-4th ELEAGUE Major: Boston 2018 
 1st WESG North America Regional Finals 
 3rd cs_summit 2 
 5th-8th StarLadder & i-League StarSeries Season 4 
 5th-6th ESL Pro League Season 7 - Finals 
 1st Adrenaline Cyber League 2018 
 5th-8th StarSeries i-League Season 5 
 1st Moche XL eSports CS:GO Cup

Counter-Strike 
 CPL
1st CPL Winter 2005 Dallas
1st CPL Summer 2005 Dallas
2nd CPL Summer 2004 Dallas
1st CPL Winter 2003 Dallas
1st CPL Europe 2003 Copenhagen
1st CPL Summer 2003 Dallas
1st CPL Europe 2003 Cannes
3rd CPL Winter 2002 Dallas
1st CPL Summer 2002 Dallas
3rd CPL Europe 2002 Cologne
 ESL
1st ESL Extreme Masters IV 09/10: Global Challenge New York  New York City
3rd ESL Extreme Masters IV 09/10: Global Finals  Germany
3rd ESL Extreme Masters IV 09/10: Global Challenge Dubai  Dubai
1st ESL Extreme Masters IV 09/10: Global Challenge Chengdu Chengdu
2nd ESL Extreme Masters III 08/09: Global Challenge Montreal Montreal
1st ESL Extreme Masters III 08/09: Global Challenge Los Angeles Los Angeles
2nd ESL Extreme Masters II 07/08: Global Challenge Los Angeles Los Angeles
 ESWC
1st ESWC 2011 Paris
2nd ESWC Masters Cheonan 2009 Cheonan
2nd ESWC 2005 Paris
3rd ESWC 2003 Poitiers
 KODE5
2nd KODE5 08/09 Moscow
3rd KODE5 07/08 Moscow
 WCG
2nd WCG 2011 Busan
2nd WCG 2008 Cologne
1st WCG Euro Championship 2007 Hannover
1st WCG 2003 Seoul

Zonerank rankings 
 Top Ranking: 2nd (March 2008)
 Current Ranking: 2nd

Quake, Painkiller & Unreal Tournament 
 1st KODE5 Finals 2006 – Johan "Toxic" Quick (Quake 4)
 1st QuakeCon 2006 – Johan "Toxic" Quick (Quake 4)
 1st World Series of Video Games Intel Summer Championship 2006 – Johan "Toxic" Quick (Quake 4)
 2nd World Series of Video Games Sweden 2006 – Johan "Toxic" Quick (Quake 4)
 1st World Series of Video Games London 2006 – Johan "Toxic" Quick (Quake 4)
 1st DigitalLife 2006 – Johan "Toxic" Quick (Quake 4)
 1st World Cyber Games 2006 – Johan "Toxic" Quick (Quake 4)
 1st World Series of Video Games Finals 2006 – Johan "Toxic" Quick (Quake 4)
 2nd 2005 CPL World Tour: Istanbul – Benjamin "zyz" Bohrmann (Painkiller)
 1st 2005 CPL World Tour: Spain – Stephan "SteLam" Lammert (Painkiller)
 3rd 2005 CPL World Tour: Brazil – Benjamin "zyz" Bohrmann (Painkiller)
 3rd Electronic Sports World Cup 2005 – Fox (Quake 3)
 3rd 2005 CPL World Tour: United Kingdom – Benjamin "zyz" Bohrmann (Painkiller)
 2nd CPL 2005 Winter – Johan "Toxic" Quick (Quake 4)
 3rd Cyberathlete Professional League: Summer 2004 – Stephan "SteLam" Lammert (Painkiller)
 1st Cyberathlete Professional League: Summer 2004 – Team (Unreal Tournament 2004)
 2nd Electronic Sports World Cup 2004 – Christian "GitzZz" Hoeck (Unreal Tournament 2004)
 1st Electronic Sports World Cup 2003 – Christian "GitzZz" Hoeck (Unreal Tournament 2003)
 3rd World Cyber Games 2001 – Stephan "SteLam" Lammert (Quake 3)

World Championships

 KODE5 (2006, Quake 4)
 World Cyber Games (2006, Quake 4)
 World Series of Video Games (2006, Quake 4)
 Electronic Sports World Cup (2003, Unreal Tournament)

Warcraft III 

 1st WCG SEC 2007 –  Mykhaylo "HoT" Novopashyn
 2nd World Series of Videogames, Finals 2006 –  Jung Hee "jamem" Chun
 3rd World Cyber Games 2006 –  Mykhaylo "HoT" Novopashyn
 1st KODE5 2006-  Andrey "Deadman" Sobolev
 1st World Series of Videogames, China 2006 –  Jung Hee "Sweet" Chun
 1st World Series of Videogames, Sweden 2006 –  Andrey "Deadman" Sobolev
 2nd NGL One Season I 2006 – Team
 3rd Warcraft 3 Champions League V 2006 – Team
 1st ClanBase EuroCup 2005 –  Mykhaylo "HoT" Novopashyn
 3rd CPL Summer 2005 –  Björn "ElakeDuck" ödman
 2nd Electronic Sports World Cup 2005 –  Andrey "Deadman" Sobolev
 3rd ACON5 2005 –  Andrey "Deadman" Sobolev
 3rd Warcraft 3 Champions League VII 2005 – Team
 2nd World E-Sport Games I 2005 –  Tae min "Zacard" Hwang
 3rd Warcraft 3 Champions League VI 2004 – Team
 2nd World Cyber Games 2004 –  Tae min "Zacard" Hwang
 2nd Electronic Sports World Cup 2004 –  Fredrik "MaDFroG" Johansson
 3rd Electronic Sports World Cup 2004 –  Alborz "HeMaN" Haidarian
 3rd ACON4 2004 –  Jung Hee "Sweet" Chun
 3rd Warcraft 3 Champions League V 2004 – Team
 1st Blizzard Worldwide Invitational 2004 –  Fredrik "MaDFroG" Johansson
 3rd Cyber X Gaming 2004 –  Zdravko "Insomnia" Georgiev
 1st World Cyber Games 2003 –  Zdravko "Insomnia" Georgiev
 1st Euro Cyber Games 2003 –  Antoine "FaTC" Zadri
 2nd Euro Cyber Games 2003 –  Georgi "Zeerax" Marinov
 1st Electronic Sports World Cup 2003 –  Alborz "HeMaN" Haidarian
 2nd Electronic Sports World Cup 2003 –  Fredrik "MaDFroG" Johansson
 3rd Clikarena 2003 –  Zdravko "Insomnia" Georgiev
 2nd CPL Cannes 2003 –  Zdravko "Insomnia" Georgiev
 2nd CPL Oslo 2002 –  Sven "Kovax" Running
 3rd CPL Oslo 2002 –  Fahad "DsCo" Hamid

World Championships

 KODE5 (2006)
 Blizzard Worldwide Invitational (2004)
 World Cyber Games (2003)
 Electronic Sports World Cup (2003)

World of Warcraft 
 World 1st kill of Felmyst
 World 1st kill of M'uru
 World 1st kill of Kil'jaeden – (final boss of The Burning Crusade).
 SK.US 1st Place at MLG Columbus
 SK.US 1st Place at the Blizzard Regional Finals
 SK.US 4th PlaceBlizzCon 3vs3 World Finals 2009
 SK.US 1st PlaceBlizzCon 3vs3 World Finals 2015

References

Notes

Citations

External links 
 

1997 establishments in Germany
Blog hosting services
Companies based in Cologne
Esports teams based in Germany
Organizations established in 1997
Internet properties established in 1997
Esports teams established in 1997
League of Legends European Championship teams
Counter-Strike teams
Defunct and inactive Smite (video game) teams
Defunct and inactive Heroes of Newerth teams
World of Warcraft teams
Defunct and inactive Overwatch teams
Hearthstone teams
Vainglory (video game) teams
 
Tom Clancy's Rainbow Six Siege teams